Frode Løberg (born 23 January 1963) is a former Norwegian biathlete.

Life and career
Løberg received a silver medal in team event at the 1991 Biathlon World Championships in Lahti, and again in Novosibirsk in 1992. He finished 5th in the team event with the Norwegian team in 1989. He finished 4th in 4 × 7.5 km relay in 1990, and 6th in team event. He competed at the 1988 Winter Olympics in Calgary where he finished 6th in 4 × 7.5 km relay with the Norwegian team. He competed at the 1992 Winter Olympics in Albertville where he finished 8th in the individual, and  5th in 4 × 7.5 km relay.

Biathlon results
All results are sourced from the International Biathlon Union.

Olympic Games

World Championships
2 medals (2 silver)

*During Olympic seasons competitions are only held for those events not included in the Olympic program.
**Team was added as an event in 1989.

Individual victories
1 victory (1 Sp)

*Results are from UIPMB and IBU races which include the Biathlon World Cup, Biathlon World Championships and the Winter Olympic Games.

References

External links
 
 

1963 births
Living people
Norwegian male biathletes
Biathletes at the 1988 Winter Olympics
Biathletes at the 1992 Winter Olympics
Olympic biathletes of Norway
Biathlon World Championships medalists
Holmenkollen Ski Festival winners
20th-century Norwegian people